One Day at Disney may refer to:
 One Day at Disney (film) a documentary film
 One Day at Disney Shorts a documentary web television series